Lost in the Feeling may refer to:
"Lost in the Feeling" (song), a 1983 song by Conway Twitty
Lost in the Feeling (Conway Twitty album), 1983
Lost in the Feeling (Mark Chesnutt album), 2000
Lost in the Feeling, a 2010 album by Jeri Lynne Fraser